Laelia anceps is a species of orchid found in Mexico and Guatemala.

Subspecies 
Laelia anceps ssp. anceps (Mexico to Guatemala).  The diploid chromosome number of L. anceps ssp. anceps has been determined as 2n = 40
Laelia anceps ssp. dawsonii (J.Anderson) Rolfe (Mexico - Guerrero, Oaxaca).  The diploid chromosome number of L. anceps ssp. dawsonii has been determined as 2n = 40.

References 

anceps
Orchids of Guatemala
Orchids of Mexico